The blue acara (Andinoacara pulcher) is a colorful freshwater fish in the cichlid family. This fish can be found in various freshwater habitats, ranging from standing water to flowing streams, in Venezuela and Trinidad. The scientific species name is indicative to its looks; pulcher meaning "beautiful" in Latin. The blue acara is a common cichlid sold in many aquarium stores, and is sometimes confused with the larger green terror (A. rivulatus).

The body of the blue acara is stocky and compact with a steel blue-gray coloration. Noticeable horizontal green lines occur on their faces and their blueish-green scales give them a sparkling appearance. They also have long, flowing fins with a hint of orange to the tips.

Description

The body is compact and stocky, while the fins are long and flowing, with a rounder head than on similar cichlids.

The main body colour can vary from browns to blues to black due to local diversity. The body is decorated with five to eight vertical black stripes (which may not always be distinctly visible) and blue iridescent spots, and the face sports a few horizontal green lines. The fins have a hint of orange on the tips and some specimens have a red topfin rim. A distinctive black line is present going from the eye down the cheek; this one line is not found on other similar cichlids.

Taxonomy
Formerly placed in the genus Aequidens, this species was moved to Andinoacara in 2009.

References

Blue acara
Fish of South America
Fish of Trinidad and Tobago
Fish described in 1858
Taxa named by Theodore Gill